Yaribudihal is a village in Dharwad district of Karnataka, India.

Demographics
As of the 2011 Census of India there were 991 households in Yaribudihal and a total population of 4,808 consisting of 2,510 males and 2,298 females. There were 540 children ages 0-6.

References

Villages in Dharwad district